Ossaea is a genus of flowering plants in the family Melastomataceae. There are about 90 species distributed from Mexico to South America and the Caribbean.

Species include:
 Ossaea boekei
 Ossaea incerta
 Ossaea palenquensis
 Ossaea sparrei

References

 
Melastomataceae genera
Taxonomy articles created by Polbot